Mikołaj Habdank Kruszewski, (Russianized, Nikolay Vyacheslavovich Krushevsky, Никола́й Вячесла́вович Круше́вский) (December 18, 1851, Lutsk – November 12, 1887, Kazan) was a Polish linguist, most significant as the co-inventor of the concept of phonemes, and relative of Anya Lucia Kruszewski. From 1883, he was a professor at Kazan University. His notable works include On Sound Alternation (1881) and Outline of Linguistic Science (1883). The former is actually the introduction to his master's thesis on morphophonemic alternation in Old Slavic (the section focusing on the theoretical background for the empirical work in the body of the thesis) and the latter is his doctoral thesis.

A student of Jan Baudouin de Courtenay (1845–1929), Kruszewski worked with de Courtenay to develop the linguistics associated with the Kazan school. These inspired other linguists. Since it is difficult to distinguish who created which concept, the systematic treatment of alternation may be attributed to both. Their innovative and highly influential work has been acclaimed  by Roman Jakobson only about a hundred years after his time.

Education
Kruszewski studied in the historical-philological faculty in Warsaw, teaching the Russian language to support himself. Desiring broader experience, he went to Kazan, where he met de Courtenay. He was a hard-working and ambitious student. He became full professor in Kazan in 1885, aged 34, after having prepared two theses. Unfortunately his brilliant career was dramatically cut off by a grave neurological and mental illness; he was to retire the same year and died in 1887.

Works
Kruszewski's major work was in the theory of alternations. He was one of the first to create a modern, systematic approach to the phonological structure of language. Above all, Kruszewski was preoccupied with classifying the alternations and describing their status.

Kruszewski proposed three types of alternations and stressed the fact that each alternation is influenced by two important factors. The first factor involves the changes sounds undergo within themselves, while the second involves the conditions that stimulate a given change. Such an approach results in the classification of alternations into three major groups.

The first category of alternations is restricted to the sounds that are very similar. Alternations that belong to this category are governed by four rules:

 The cause of the alternation is determinate
 The alternation is general
 The alternation has no exceptions
 Alternations occur among sounds that do not differ markedly in phonetic properties.
An example of the first type are those variations between particular sounds in Russian as a function of the palatalization of the preceding consonant.

The alternations that represent the second and third categories are quite similar and there are three important conditions under which the alternations take place:

 The cause of the alternation may be absent
 The alternation may have exceptions
 Alternations occur among sounds that differ markedly in phonetic properties.

The sounds involved in alternations of the sounds of the second and the third category are known as correlatives. The only difference between the second and the third category is the degree to which a given category is morphologized. Kruszewski's example for the second category is u-umlaut in Icelandic. He does not strictly separate the second and the third category.

This classification is an important framework that presents one of many ways of perceiving a language.

References
 A. Adamska-Sałaciak & M. Smoczyńska, eds. Mikołaj Kruszewski, His Life and Scholarly Work, trans. W. Browne. Krakow: Uniwersytet Jagiellonski, 2005.
 Anderson, S.R., 1985. Phonology in the Twentieth Century. Chicago, The University of Chicago.
 Fisiak, J., 1978. Wstęp do współczesnych teorii lingwistycznych. Warszawa, Wydawnictwo Szkolne i Pedagogiczne.
 Jakobson, R. (1972). The Kazan school of Polish linguistics and its place in the international development of phonology. In: Jakobson, R. (ed) Selected Writings. Vol. II: Word and Language. Hague: Mouton.
 Kruszewski, Mikołaj, [1995].  Writings in General Linguistics:  On Sound Alternation (1881) and Outline of Linguistic Science (1883) (Koerner, E.F.K., ed.), John Benjamins Publishing Co.

1851 births
1887 deaths
People from Lutsk
Linguists from Poland
Linguists from Russia